The Sigou Formation is a Late Cretaceous geologic formation in China. Fossil dinosaur eggs have been reported from the formation, including Dictyoolithus.

See also

 List of dinosaur-bearing rock formations
 List of stratigraphic units with dinosaur trace fossils
 Dinosaur eggs

Footnotes

References
 Weishampel, David B.; Dodson, Peter; and Osmólska, Halszka (eds.): The Dinosauria, 2nd, Berkeley: University of California Press. 861 pp. .

Geologic formations of China
Upper Cretaceous Series of Asia
Ooliferous formations